Ines Vercesi (5 January 1916 –  24 April 1997) was an Italian gymnast who competed in the 1928 Summer Olympics. In 1928, she won the silver medal as member of the Italian gymnastics team.

References

External links
 

1916 births
1997 deaths
Italian female artistic gymnasts
Olympic gymnasts of Italy
Gymnasts at the 1928 Summer Olympics
Olympic silver medalists for Italy
Olympic medalists in gymnastics
Medalists at the 1928 Summer Olympics